Andrew Critchlow (born c. 1974) is a business journalist. He is head of EMEA news at S&P Global Platts.

Life and career
Critchlow was born in County Durham. He was educated at Barnard Castle School followed by the University of Bradford where he read Peace Studies, followed by Durham University where he read for a master's degree in Middle East politics.

He joined the army as a Grenadier guard between 1992 and 1996 where he served in Northern Ireland, East Africa and the Middle East before moving into business journalism.

From 2000 to 2004, Critchlow was the senior Gulf correspondent in Dubai for the Middle East Economic Digest.

He was the Gulf OPEC correspondent and deputy bureau chief at Bloomberg from 2004 to 2007.

Between 2007 and 2010, he was Middle East managing editor of Dow Jones Newswires and the Zawya Dow Jones News Service.

In 2010, he became Sydney bureau chief for Wall Street Journal/Dow Jones.

In 2013, he joined the Telegraph Media Group as business news editor and later became commodities editor.

He left the Telegraph in October 2015, and joined S&P Global Platts.

References

External links
Profile at The Daily Telegraph website

People educated at Barnard Castle School
Alumni of Durham University
English male journalists
Living people
Dow Jones & Company people
Telegraph Media Group
Grenadier Guards officers
Alumni of the University of Bradford
Bloomberg L.P. people
The Wall Street Journal people
People from County Durham
1974 births
Military personnel from County Durham
20th-century British Army personnel